The TL Ultralight TL-96 Star is a single-engine, side-by-side configuration two seat ultralight, designed in the Czech Republic in the 1990s. More than 150 have been registered.

Design and development

The TL-96 Star is a single-engine, low wing monoplane seating two side by side under a prominent single-piece, forward-hinging canopy. A second, fixed transparency forms the rear of the cabin.  The structure is all composite, a mixture of glass and carbon fibre reinforced plastics (CFRP).  Its wings are unswept and have constant chord apart from a slight rounding of the leading edge at the tips; they carry plain inboard flaps.  The one-piece, all-moving tailplane has a similar plan and is fitted with a central anti-balance tab. The fin and rudder are swept, the latter horn balanced.  It has a tricycle undercarriage with faired wheels and cable brakes.

The Star can be powered by one of several flat four engines, including the 60 kW (80 hp) Rotax 912, the 86 kW (115 hp) Rotax 914 or the 67 kW (90 hp) Aero Prag AP-45. The Rotax engines drive three-blade propeller, the Aero Prag a two-blade wooden one.

The Star flew for the first time in November 1997 and had achieved German certification before 2000.

Variants
TL-2000 StingCarbon
An all CFRP version, introduced in 2002, that gained Czech certification. Its span was reduced by 760 mm (30 in) and length by 570 mm (22.4 in), though the empty weight increased by 10 kg (22 lbs).  
TL 2000 RG
A retractable gear model with a cruise speed of  that was announced before the first flight at Aero '03 in Friedrichshafen.
TL StingSport
US SLSA model introduced in 2005
TL-2000 Sting S3
Model announced at Sun'n'Fun, Lakeland, Florida, succeeding the StingSport. This is an advanced version of the StingSport with a new, tapered wing of greater span (9.11 m or 29 ft 11 in), area and aspect ratio and with larger flaps.  It has a higher level of instrumentation and a Rotax 912ULS engine.

TL-2000 Sting S4
Model introduced in 2010 that is an improved version of the S3. It incorporates a revised canopy, cockpit, nose landing gear and engine cowling. Standard engines available are the  Rotax 912UL,  Rotax 912ULS and 912iS, and the turbocharged  Rotax 914 four-stroke powerplants.
TL-2000 Sting S4 RG
Standard engines available are the  Rotax 912ULS and 912iS, and the turbocharged  Rotax 914 four-stroke powerplants.

Operational history
As of mid-2010, there were 202 TL-96 Stars and 153 TL-2000 Stings on European civil registers, excluding Russia.

Accidents
On 25 July 2020, shortly after takeoff a TL-96 suffered a structural failure and crashed into a residential building near the city of Wesel in Western Germany, killing both aircraft occupants and one woman in the apartment that it impacted.

Specifications (TL-96 Star, Rotax 912)

References

External links

 TL Ultralight product page

TL-96 Star
1990s Czech and Czechoslovakian ultralight aircraft